Sarah Pinsker is an American science fiction and fantasy author. A nine-time finalist for the Nebula Award, Pinsker's debut novel A Song for a New Day won the 2019 Nebula for Best Novel while her story Our Lady of the Open Road won 2016 award for Best Novelette. Her novelette "Two Truths and a Lie" received both the Nebula Award and the Hugo Award. Her fiction has also won the Philip K. Dick Award, the Theodore Sturgeon Memorial Award and been a finalist for the Hugo, World Fantasy, and Tiptree Awards.

Life

Pinsker was born in New York and lived in several places of the United States including Illinois and Texas. When she was 14, her family settled in Toronto, Canada. She returned to the US to attend college. She currently lives in Baltimore, Maryland, where she has managed grants for a nonprofit. In addition to writing fiction she is a singer-songwriter with the band Stalking Horses and has had multiple albums released through independent labels. She also volunteers as director at large for the Science Fiction & Fantasy Writers of America (SFWA) and hosts the Baltimore Science Fiction Society's Dangerous Voices Variety Hour reading series.

Writing

Pinsker says her writing is heavily influenced by the science fiction and literary fiction which filled her parents' home, adding she is one of the rare authors who read "short stories as much as novels" when she was young. Among her early influences as an author were the works of Ursula K. Le Guin and Kate Wilhelm. Later influences on her fiction include Octavia Butler, Karen Joy Fowler, Kij Johnson, and Kelly Link.

Pinsker started out publishing her short fiction in magazines such as Asimov's Science Fiction, Fantasy & Science Fiction, Lightspeed, Strange Horizons, Daily Science Fiction, the Journal of Unlikely Cartography, and Fireside. Anthologies containing her stories include Long Hidden, How to Live on Other Planets, Queers Destroy Science Fiction, and Whose Future is It?. Among the collections of the "year's best" stories which include her stories are The Best Science Fiction of the Year Volume 2, Year's Best Weird Fiction Vol 2, Year's Best Young Adult Speculative Fiction 2015, The Year's Best YA Speculative Fiction and The Year's Best Military and Adventure Fiction 2015.

In 2019, her debut novel A Song for a New Day was published. The novel follows the life of a musician in a future where pandemics and terrorism makes public events such as concerts illegal. In 2020, it won the Nebula Award for Best Novel of 2019.

Pinsker's fiction has been called "thoughtful, subtle", "creepy" and "dreamlike". Speaking of her fiction, Pinsker says "It is a good time to be someone who has something to say about a group or a personal experience that hasn't been touched on before. Science fiction looks at the world through a slightly different lens, so it's fun to put that lens onto new experiences."

Awards

Pinsker has been nominated nine times for the Nebula Award, winning in the categories of Best Novel and Best Novelette (twice) as well as Best Short Story. For "Two Truths and a Lie" she was afforded the Hugo Award in the category of Best Novelette in addition to the Nebula Award for the corresponding category, respectively, and in which she came 2nd place in the Locus Awards. She has also won the Philip K. Dick Award and the Theodore Sturgeon Memorial Award along with being a five-time finalist for the Hugo through other works and a finalist for the World Fantasy and Otherwise Awards.

Source: 

Additionally,
 "No Lonely Seafarer" (short story in Lightspeed, Sept. 2014) selected as an honorable mention for the 2014 Otherwise Award.

Bibliography

Novels

Short fiction 
Collections
 
Chapbooks
 
 
Stories

References

External links
 
 

21st-century American women
Asimov's Science Fiction people
American science fiction writers
American women short story writers
Hugo Award-winning writers
Living people
Nebula Award winners
Year of birth missing (living people)